The Bozzuto Group is a real estate company. Bozzuto has four main divisions—Bozzuto Management Company, Bozzuto Construction Company, Bozzuto Development Company, and Bozzuto Homes Inc. The company has developed, acquired, and built more than 45,000 homes and apartments. Currently, it manages more than 70,000 apartments and 2.2 million square feet of retail space along the East Coast between Miami and Boston, in the Northeast and Chicago. Its headquarters are in Greenbelt, Maryland. It was subsidized by Prince George's County, Maryland in 2013.

Companies

Construction 
Services:

 General Contracting
 Preconstruction
 Virtual Design & Technology
 Renovations & Capital Improvements

Property Management 
Services:

 Residential Leasing and Management
 Lease-Up and Transitions
 Advisory Services
 Retail Management and Tenant Coordination
 Maintenance and Engineering

Background 
Tom S. Bozzuto and his three partners John Slidell, Rick Mostyn, and the late Bernie Lubcher founded the company in 1988.

In 2013, Tom’s son Toby Bozzuto took over as Chief Executive Officer and President.

In 2014, he received the developer of the year award from the Maryland Building Industry Association. According to The Washington Post, the company has developed more than 50,000 homes and apartments since its inception.

Awards 
Bozzuto has been recognized by many national and regional organizations. For five consecutive years, from 2015 to 2019, Bozzuto has been named Top Property Management Company for Online Reputation by Multifamily Executive Magazine and J Turner Research. In 2016, the National Association of Home Builders (NAHB) named Bozzuto "Multifamily Development Firm of the Year" at their Pillars of Industry Awards. Bozzuto Construction Company was also ranked 17th out of the National Multifamily Housing Council's (NMHC) "25 Largest General Contractors."

Bozzuto has received awards for its workplace culture. They have repeatedly earned awards like The Washington Posts "Top Workplaces", the Washington Business Journals "Best Places to Work" and The Baltimore Suns "Top Workplace". They have several offices in the Washington D.C. and Northern Virginia area.

References

External links
 Official website

Construction and civil engineering companies of the United States
American companies established in 1988
Companies based in Prince George's County, Maryland
Greenbelt, Maryland
Real estate companies of the United States
1988 establishments in Maryland